Strobilurus torquatus is a species of lizard in the family Tropiduridae, the neotropical ground lizards. It is found in Brazil.

References

Tropiduridae
Lizards of South America
Reptiles of Brazil
Reptiles described in 1834
Taxa named by Arend Friedrich August Wiegmann